Laurie Stone (born 1946) is an American writer and critic.

Biography
Stone is a graduate of Barnard College (1968) and holds an MA from Columbia University (1969). She taught at Hunter College and Queens College from 1969 to 1975. After many years as a journalist at The Village Voice (1974–1999), she was appointed theater critic for The Nation and critic-at-large on NPR's Fresh Air.  Her books include a story collection, My Life as an Animal (Northwestern University Press),  an essay collection, Laughing in the Dark (Ecco), a novel, Starting with Serge (Doubleday), and an essay collection, Streaming Now: Postcards from the Thing That Is Happening (Dottir Press).

Awards
In 1995, Stone won the Nona Balakian Excellence in Reviewing Award from the National Book Critics Circle.

References

External links 
 

1946 births
Living people
21st-century American novelists
American women novelists
21st-century American women writers
Barnard College alumni
Hunter College faculty
Queens College, City University of New York faculty
Novelists from New York (state)